Nocardiopsis exhalans is a species of bacteria. It produces methanol-soluble toxins that paralyse the motility of boar spermatozoa. Its type strain is ES10.1T.

References

Further reading
Whitman, William B., et al., eds. Bergey's manual® of systematic bacteriology. Vol. 5. Springer, 2012.

External links
LPSN

Type strain of Nocardiopsis exhalans at BacDive -  the Bacterial Diversity Metadatabase

Actinomycetales
Bacteria described in 2002